The 76th Maintenance Wing is a wing of the United States Air Force based out of Tinker Air Force Base, Oklahoma.

Subordinate Organizations
76th Aircraft Maintenance Group (76 AMXG)
76th Propulsion Maintenance Group (76 PMXG)
76th Commodities Maintenance Group (76 CMXG)
76th Software Maintenance Group (76 SMXG) - The Group is a major software development and production organizations for the United States Air Force. Personnel provide expert software support for the B-1, B-2, B-52 and E-3 aircraft. In addition, the group provides software maintenance for all cruise missiles. In support of the depot mission and warfighter shops, the group provides software design and maintenance for all assigned engines and a variety of individual components and systems.
76th Maintenance Support Group (76 MXSG)

History
The Wing furnished administrative and logistical support for the San Antonio Air Materiel Area (later, San Antonio Air Logistics Center) and numerous tenant organizations on the base.  It became host wing of Kelly Air Force Base on 17 August 1959.  The wing has frequently supported humanitarian and disaster relief missions and deployed personnel in support of operations in Southwest Asia in 1990 and 1991.

On 1 October 2012, the Oklahoma City Air Logistics Center was redesignated as the Oklahoma City Air Logistics Complex and leadership of the complex was transferred from the former 76th Maintenance Wing. (https://www.tinker.af.mil/About-Us/Fact-Sheets/Display/Article/384764/oklahoma-city-air-logistics-complex/)

Lineage
 Designated as the 2851st Air Base Wing and organized on 1 August 1953
 Redesignated 2851st Air Base Group on 16 October 1964
 Redesignated 651st Support Group on 1 October 1992
 Redesignated 651st Air Base Group on 1 October 1993
 Redesignated 76th Air Base Wing on 1 October 1994
 Inactivated on 30 May 2001
 Redesignated 76th Maintenance Wing
 Activated on 18 February 2005
 Inactivated on 1 October 2012

Assignments
San Antonio Air Materiel Area (later San Antonio Air Logistics Center): 1 August 1953 – 30 May 2001
Oklahoma City Air Logistics Center: 18 February 2005 - 1 October 2012 (attached to Air Force Sustainment Center after 10 July 2012)

Stations
Kelly Air Force Base, Texas, 1 August 1953 – 30 May 2001
Tinker Air Force Base, Oklahoma, 18 February 2005 - 1 October 2012

References

External links
Tinker AFB Home Page

Military units and formations in Oklahoma
0076
1942 establishments in the United States